Furka is a village in the south-eastern part of North Macedonia. It is situated in the center of the triangle between Bogdanci, Dojran and Valandovo,  from Dojran. All around the village there are little heights, composed of sandy soil and rocks of granite. There is vine and fruit growing. The population is about 1000 people, most are Macedonians and Orthodox Christians.

Furka is part of the Dojran Municipality, which is one of the most popular tourist places in North Macedonia.

The name 
Stjepan Antoljak says that Furka was the place where Byzantine king Vassilius in Furka had blinded the soldiers of Samuil of Bulgaria, and that the origin of the name is the Greek word "furka", which means "place of execution". This theory is considered as incorrect. Aleksandar Stojanovski thinks that origin of the name is from Turkish word "fursat" (bad people), because villagers had never allowed Turkish people to come to live in Furka. The origin of the name of Furka is still unknown.

History 

According to historical sources Furka existed for at least 1000 years.

The village had a few hostelries and 50 families, on the road Üsküb (Skopje) - Selânik (Thessaloniki) and the road between Istanbul and Albania.

In 1530 Furka is mentioned as a derven village. Except for agriculture, people were occupied with dervening. They had taken the responsibility to keep the road Valandovo - Dojran, on which Furka was settled, from Turkish rebels. At the derven place, one male of every family stood guard every day. Therefore, some historians believe that on the name Furka, for a few decades, was added the name "derven".

In 1573 Furka was a big town with 125 families.

By the legend, three monks who passed through Furka stopped to spend the night in one of the hostelries, but they were brutally killed by Turkish rebels. People were scared of the frequent attacks and started to move. The location of old Furka today is called Anishte (hostelries).

They continued with agriculture, and in 1878 they built the new church Sveti Ilija (Saint Eliyah).

Demographics
According to the 2002 census, the village had a total of 5470 inhabitants. Ethnic groups in the village include:

Macedonians 563
Serbs 6
Others 1

References

External links
 Furka on Google Maps   
 More on Furka

Villages in Dojran Municipality